Gh is a digraph found in many languages.

In Latin-based orthographies

Indo-European languages

Germanic languages

English
In English  historically represented  (the voiceless velar fricative, as in the Scottish Gaelic word ), and still does in lough and certain other Hiberno-English words, especially proper nouns. In the dominant dialects of modern English,  is almost always either silent or pronounced  (see Ough).

When gh occurs at the beginning of a word in English, it is pronounced  as in "ghost", "ghastly", "ghoul", "ghetto", "ghee" etc. In this context, it does not derive from a former .

American Literary Braille has a dedicated cell pattern for the digraph  (dots 126, ⠣).

Middle Dutch
This usage survives in place name such as Ghent. 

Latin languages

In Galician, it is often used to represent the pronunciation of gheada.

Irish

Juǀʼhoan 
In Juǀʼhoan, it's used for the prevoiced aspirated velar plosive .

Malay
In the Malay and Indonesian alphabet,  is used to represent the voiced velar fricative in Arabic origin words.

Maltese
The Maltese language has a related digraph, . It is considered a single letter, called għajn (the same word for eye and spring, named for the corresponding Arabic letter ʿayn). It is usually silent, but it is necessary to be included because it changes the pronunciation of neighbouring letters, usually lengthening the succeeding vowels. At the end of a word, when not substituted by an apostrophe, it is pronounced . Its function is thus not unlike modern English gh, except that the English version comes after vowels rather than before like Maltese għ (għajn would come out something like ighn if spelled as in English).

Swahili 
In the Roman Swahili alphabet,  is used to represent the voiced velar fricative in Arabic origin words.

Tlingit
In Canadian Tlingit  represents , which in Alaska is written .

Taiwanese

Uyghur
In Uyghur Latin script, gh represents .

Vietnamese

In romanization
In the romanization of various languages,  usually represents the voiced velar fricative. Like  ,  may also be pharyngealized, as in several Caucasian and Native American languages.
In transcriptions of Indo-Aryan languages such as Sanskrit and Hindi, as well as their ancestor, Proto-Indo-European,  represents a voiced velar aspirated plosive  (often referred to as a breathy or murmured voiced velar plosive).

The Ukrainian National transliteration system uses  to avoid occurrence of another digraph, usually  which is used for another type of phoneme. Such as the word "pack" (a group of animals) in Ukrainian would be Romanized as zghraia rather than zhraia, which could be misconstrued to intend . The Ukrainian transliteration standard DSTU 9112:2021 (based on ISO 9:1995) uses  to represent common Ukrainian letter г (the glottal fricative).

See also
 Phonological history of English consonants
 Yogh

References

Latin-script digraphs